Haukanes is a village in Austevoll municipality in Vestland county, Norway.

References

Villages in Vestland
Austevoll